The 2023 CONIFA European Football Cup will be the fourth edition of this tournament, an international football tournament for states, minorities, stateless peoples and regions unaffiliated with FIFA with an affiliation to Europe, organised by CONIFA. Northern Cyprus were originally announced as hosts, but withdrew to support humanitarian efforts in Turkey.

Hosts 
Originally Northern Cyprus was announced as the host on 9 November 2022. However, on 16 February 2023, following the 2023 Turkey–Syria earthquake the decision was made to relocate the tournament to enable Northern Cyprus to focus on supporting humanitarian efforts in Turkey. No replacement host was announced at the time.

Participants

Draw
A total of twelve teams were scheduled to participate, with their seedings below.

Tournament

Format
Twelve teams will be divided into four groups of three teams.

At the end of the tournament, the four semifinalists will qualify for the 2024 CONIFA World Football Cup. In addition, the six first qualified teams will clinch a direct spot for the 2026 European Football Cup.

Group stage

Group A

Group B

Group C

Group D

Final standings
Per statistical convention in football, matches decided in extra time are counted as wins and losses, while matches decided by penalty shoot-outs are counted as draws.

References

External links 
CONIFA official website
Cyprus Turkish Football Federation official website

CONIFA European Football Cup
CONIFA European Football Cup
Sport in Northern Cyprus
Football competitions in Northern Cyprus
CONIFA European Football Cup